The 1990 All-Big Eight Conference football team consists of American football players chosen by various organizations for All-Big Eight Conference teams for the 1990 NCAA Division I-A football season.  The selectors for the 1990 season included the Associated Press (AP).

Offensive selections

Quarterbacks
 Darian Hagan, Colorado (AP-1)

Running backs
 Eric Bieniemy, Colorado (AP-1)
 Gerald Hudson, Oklahoma State (AP-1)

Tight ends
 Johnny Mitchell, Nebraska (AP-1)

Wide receivers
 Mike Pritchard, Colorado (AP-1)
 Linzy Collins, Missouri (AP-1)

Centers
 Jay Leeuwenburg, Colorado (AP-1)

Offensive linemen
 Joe Garten, Colorado (AP-1)
 Mark Vander Poel, Colorado (AP-1)
 Tom Punt, Nebraska (AP-1)
 Gene Williams, Iowa State (AP-1)

Defensive selections

Defensive ends
 Kanavis McGhee, Colorado (AP-1)
 Alfred Williams, Colorado (AP-1)

Defensive lineman
 Kenny Walker, Nebraska (AP-1)
 Joel Steed, Colorado (AP-1)
 Scott Evans, Oklahoma (AP-1)
 Gary Howe, Colorado (AP-1)

Linebackers
 Mike Crael, Nebraska (AP-1)
 Pat Tyrance, Nebraska (AP-1)

Defensive backs
 Reggie Cooper, Nebraska (AP-1)
 Harry Colon, Missouri (AP-1)
 Tim James, Colorado (AP-1)

Special teams

Place-kicker
 Jeff Shudak, Iowa State (AP-1)

Punter
 Dan Eichoff, Kansas (AP-1)

Key

AP = Associated Press

See also
 1990 College Football All-America Team

References

All-Big Seven Conference football team
All-Big Eight Conference football teams